Lake Ingalls is a glacial lake located in Chelan County, Washington and in the Alpine Lakes Wilderness. The lake is a popular area for hiking  and offers excellent views of nearby Mount Stuart.

See also
Mount Stuart
List of lakes of the Alpine Lakes Wilderness

References

Lakes of Washington (state)
Lakes of Chelan County, Washington